Linda Fargo is the senior vice president (since 2006) of the fashion office and the director of women's fashion and store presentation for the Bergdorf Goodman department store in New York City.

Early life and education 
Born in 1957, she grew up in the suburbs of Milwaukee and received her Bachelor of Fine Arts degree from the University of Wisconsin–Madison. After her move to New York, she started as a window dresser at Macy’s, eventually rising to become the visual director.

Career 
She joined Berdorf Goodman as the display director in June 1996. Fargo was one of eighteen Manhattan window-display designers that collaborated on the Cooper Hewitt, Smithsonian Design Museum's The Window Show in May 1999. That year she was both vice president for visual presentations and director of visual merchandising. She and Robert Burke designed the 2001 Whitney Museum of American Art's annual gala called Nightclub as Monument, inspired on New York café society and the museum's retrospective of Edward Steichen's photographic works from the 1920s and 1930s. 

After the September 11 attacks, Fargo and her team "completely readjusted" their display plans, which were originally going to be "an homage to the arts," instead focusing on having each window facing Fifth Avenue decorated in a separate value or virtue, while the 57th Street windows were a black-and-white collage of New York landmarks, and the 58th Street windows centered around children. One of the Fifth Avenue windows that year was highlighted by The New York Times as capturing the transition between "traditional sparkles and reds to a quieter, neutral wheat and organic palette" in holiday tastes. Assouline published Dreams Through the Glass: Windows from Bergdorf Goodman, written by Fargo herself, the $50 book was a retrospective of her displays, which Harper's Bazaar called "designs [which] prove that at its most sublime, window dressing is an art form."

At Bergdorf, she works with David Hoey, the present window dresser and senior director for visual presentation, with whom she creates "about 450 windows a year."

In the Media 
At a Cystic Fibrosis Foundation fundraiser held at Macy's in 1985, Fargo wore "lace gloves and a black dress borrowed from Kim Stoddard," which The New York Times described as "very new wave." 

In 2013 she was featured in the documentary Scatter My Ashes at Bergdorf's (the title lifted from the caption of a 1990 Victoria Roberts cartoon that appeared in pages of The New Yorker). Variety said of Fargo in its review of the film, "Bergdorf's fashion director, Linda Fargo, effortlessly commands centerstage for long stretches as she vets new designers' collections for kindly 'maybe later' rejection or 'welcome to the family' acceptance."

References

Living people
American fashion businesspeople
American socialites
American textile industry businesspeople
American women business executives
Businesspeople from Milwaukee
University of Wisconsin–Madison alumni
Year of birth missing (living people)
21st-century American women